The Ice Hockey World Championships is an annual event held by the International Ice Hockey Federation (IIHF). It was preceded by the European Championship which was held from 1910 to 1932. The first World Championship tournament was decided at the 1920 Summer Olympics. Subsequently, ice hockey was featured at the Winter Olympic Games, where the World Championship was decided when the two events occurred concurrently, until the 1968 Winter Olympics. The first three championships were contested at the Olympics, while the first World Championships that were an individual event were held in 1930.

The modern format for the World Championship features 16 teams in the championship group, 12 teams in Division I and 12 teams in Division II. If there are more than 40 teams, the rest compete in Division III. The teams in the championship play a preliminary and qualifying round, then the top eight teams play in the playoff medal round and the winning team is crowned World Champion. From the 1920 Olympics until the 1976 World Championships, only athletes designated as "amateur" were allowed to compete in the tournament. Because of this, players from the National Hockey League and its senior minor-league teams were not allowed to compete, while the Soviet Union was allowed to use permanent full-time players who were positioned as regular workers of an aircraft industry or tractor industry employer that sponsored what would be presented as an after-hours amateur social sports society team for their workers. In 1970, after an agreement to allow just a small number of its professionals to participate was rescinded by the IIHF, Canada withdrew from the tournament. Starting in 1977, professional athletes were allowed to compete in the tournament and Canada re-entered, using some NHL players from those teams that were not good enough to reach the Stanley Cup playoffs.

As of 2022, 85 tournaments have been staged. From 1920 to 1930, the Winter Olympic Games Ice Hockey Tournaments held counted as the World Championships and no tournaments in between were held. No championships were held from 1940 to 1946 due to World War II, nor during the Olympic years 1980, 1984 and 1988, nor in 2020 due to COVID-19 pandemic. Ten nations have won a gold medal at the World Championships and a total of fourteen have won medals. Canada has won 52 medals, the most of any nation. The Soviet Union, which began competing in the year of 1954 and last competed in 1991, captured a medal in each of 34 tournaments they entered. In winning the 2006 World Championships, Sweden became the first nation in sports history to win an Olympic gold as well as a separate World Championship in the same season. In 2022 Finland repeated this achievement by winning the World Championships at home.

Champions
Key

Total hosts

* = co-hosts

Medal table
Countries in italics no longer compete at the World Championships.

Finals
Since the introduction of play-off rounds in 1992, the following national teams have made the finals.

Most successful players
Boldface denotes active ice hockey players and highest medal count among all players (including these who not included in these tables) per type. "Position" denotes player position on the hockey rink (D – defenceman; F – forward; G – goaltender).

Multiple gold medalists

Multiple medalists
The table shows players who have won at least 11 medals in total at the World Championships.

Best performers by country
Here are listed most successful players in the history of each of 14 medal-winning national teams – according to the gold-first ranking system and by total number of World Championships medals (one player if he holds national records in both categories or few players if these national records belongs to different persons). If the total number of medals is identical, the gold, silver and bronze medals are used as tie-breakers (in that order). If all numbers are the same, the players get the same placement and are sorted by the alphabetic order.

See also
List of IIHF World Championship directorate award winners
List of IIHF World Junior Championship medalists
IIHF World Women's Championship
4 Nations Cup
Ice hockey at the Olympic Games

References

General

External links
International Ice Hockey Federation
Medal table and alternative medal table

Medalists
World Championship, IIHF, medalists
IIHF World Championship
IIHF World Championship